USCGC Alert (WMEC-630) is a United States Coast Guard medium endurance cutter and is the last  medium endurance cutter constructed. The keel was laid on 5 January 1968 at the United States Coast Guard Yard at Curtis Bay, Maryland, and she was commissioned on Coast Guard Day, 4 August 1969. Alert derives her name from the early 19th century revenue cutter , which served in the early days of the Revenue Cutter Service.

External links

Alert home page

Reliance-class cutters
Alert (WMEC-630)
Ships built by the United States Coast Guard Yard
1969 ships